John Chandos McConnell (27 July 1917 – 21 September 1987) was a Scottish film and television actor.

He won a scholarship to RADA in 1936. During the Second World War he served with the Seaforth Highlanders, Parachute Regiment and the GHQ Liaison Regiment.

Filmography

 49th Parallel (1941) - Lohrmann
 The Next of Kin (1942) - No 16: his contact
 The First of the Few (1942) - Krantz
 The Life and Adventures of Nicholas Nickleby (1947) - Employment Agent (uncredited)
 Secret People (1952) - John
 Derby Day (1952) - Man on Train (uncredited)
 The Crimson Pirate (1952) - Stub Ear
 Trent's Last Case (1952) - Tim O'Reilly (uncredited)
 The Long Memory (1953) - Boyd
 36 Hours (1953) - Orville Hart
 The Love Lottery (1954) - Gulliver Kee
 The Million Pound Note (1954) - 2nd Businessman at Bumbles Hotel (uncredited)
 Beau Brummell (1954) - Silva (uncredited)
 Carrington V.C. (1955) - Adjutant John Rawlinson
 Simba (1955) - Settler at Meeting
 The Ship That Died of Shame (1955) - Raines
 One Way Out (1955) - Danvers
 The Green Man (1956) - McKechnie
 The Battle of the River Plate (1956) - Dr. Otto Langmann - German Minister, Montevideo
 Time Without Pity (1957) - First Journalist
 Doctor at Large (1957) - O'Malley
 I Accuse! (1958) - Drumont
 The Witness (1959) - Lodden
 Jungle Street (1960) - Jacko Fielding
 The Little Ones (1965) - Lord Brantley
 Two Gentlemen Sharing (1969) - Advertising Executive (final film role)

References

External links
 

1917 births
1987 deaths
British male film actors
British male television actors
Alumni of RADA
British Army personnel of World War II
Male actors from Glasgow
20th-century British male actors
Seaforth Highlanders soldiers
British Parachute Regiment soldiers